The 2017 National Invitational Volleyball Championship began on Tuesday, November 28, 2017 and concluded on Tuesday, December 12. The first 15 automatic qualifying teams were announced on Sunday, November 21, and the full field was announced after the NCAA Tournament selection show on the night of Sunday, November 26. All games were played at on-campus sites, and the finals were streamed live on ESPN3.

Originally announced as featuring 64 teams, the inaugural tournament was limited to 32 teams.

The University of Mississippi's "Ole Miss" Rebels hosted one of the eight regional tournaments, where they defeated Stephen F. Austin 3–0 and Arkansas State 3–1. Remaining a host team through the rest of the tournament, Ole Miss downed Georgia 3–0 in the quarterfinals, West Virginia 3–0 in the semifinals, and Texas Tech 3–0 in the championship match.

Qualifying Teams
Automatic qualifications (AQ) were granted to the best team from each of the 32 conferences that was not invited to the 2017 NCAA Division I women's volleyball tournament. An automatic qualifier from any conference that declined a bid vacated the qualifier for that conference. Invitations were declined by nine teams and/or their conferences. Three conferences were given at-large bids but no AQs, based on criteria set by Triple Crown Sports. Vacancies were filled by at-large bids offered to the teams with the highest RPI, regardless of conference or geographic location. Teams were assigned to four-team geographic regionals that met at on-campus sites.

Automatic qualifiers

 * = College of Charleston, one of the first 15 announced AQs received an at-large invitation to the NCAA tournament and was replaced by Towson.

At-large bids

Brackets
Source= 

All games were played at campus sites. The sixteen first and eight second round regional tournament games were played November 28–December 1, 2017. Four quarterfinal games were played December 3–6. The two semifinal games were played  December 7–9. The final game was played at 7 p.m. Eastern Time on Tuesday, December 12 and live-streamed on ESPN3.

 H = host; h = home team; v = visitor

All-tournament team
Source =

References

External links
 NIVC website

Tournament
National Invitational Volleyball Championship
Women's volleyball